Celia is a given name for women of Latin origin, as well as a nickname for Cecilia, Cecelia, Celeste, or Celestina. The name is often derived from the Roman family name Caelius, thought to originate in the Latin caelum ("heaven"). Celia was popular in British pastoral literature in the seventeenth and eighteenth centuries, possibly stemming from the ruler of the House of Holiness in Edmund Spenser's epic poem The Faerie Queene or from a character in William Shakespeare's play As You Like It. Celia is also the name of the main character in the series Celia's Journey, by Melissa Gunther.

Names with similar meanings in other languages 
Kūlani ("heavenly", Hawaiian)
Silke (German)
Sylia (Berber)
Shiela (English)
Célia (French)
Celia (Galician, Italian, Polish, Spanish)
Ουρανία ("heavens", Greek)
Cèlia (Catalan)
Célia (Portuguese)
Ciel, Cielke, Cieltje (Dutch)
Síle (Irish, Gaelic)
Silje (Norwegian)

People with the name
 Celia (slave), executed in 1855
Celia Adler, actress
Célia Allamargot, squash player
Celia Barlow, politician
Celia Birtwell, textile designer
Celia Chazelle, historian
Celia Corres, field hockey player
Celia Cruz, singer
Celia Douty, murder victim
Celia Dropkin, poet
Celia W. Dugger, journalism
Celia Farber, journalism
Celia Fiennes, travel writer
Celia Franca, founder of National Ballet of Canada
Celia S. Friedman, writer
Celia Green, intellectual and author
Celia Gregory, actress
Celia Grillo Borromeo, scientist
Celia Imrie, actress
Celia Jiménez (chef), Spanish chef
Celia Jiménez (footballer) (born 1995), Spanish footballer
Celia Johnson, actress
Celia Kaye, actress
Celia Keenan-Bolger, actress
Celia Kitzinger, professor
Celia Larkin, partner of Irish Prime Minister
Celia Levetus (1874-1936), Canadian-English author, poet and illustrator
Celia Logan, actress and writer
Celia Lovsky, actress
Celia Rees, author
Celia Sánchez, Cuban revolutionary
Célia Šašić (born 1988), German footballer
Celia Sebiri (1913-2006), American award-winning jewelry designer
Celia Thaxter, poetry and stories
Celia Walden, novelist and journalist

Fictional characters 
 Celia, a character and a bachelorette in Harvest Moon: A Wonderful Life and Harvest Moon DS
Celia (As You Like It), a character in William Shakespeare's play As You Like It
Celia in Lionel Shriver's We Need To Talk About Kevin
Celia, the object of Strephon's obsession in Jonathan Swift's The Lady's Dressing Room
Celia Brooke, sister of Dorothea Brooke, the central character of George Eliot's Middlemarch (1873)
Celia Coplestone, in T. S. Eliot's The Cocktail Party
Celia Gálvez de Montalbán, in Elena Fortún's classic Spanish series of novels which began in 1929 with Celia, lo que dice
Celia Hamilton, in the Mandie series by Lois Gladys Leppard
Celia in Ben Jonson's "Song to Celia" from The Forest (another Celia also appears in Jonson's play Volpone, the wife of the merchant Corvino).
Celia “Cece” Mack, a main character on Disney Channel series Andi Mack
Celia Bowen in The Night Circus.
Celia in Fledgling by Octavia E. Butler
 Celia Facilier, a character from Descendants 3
Celia Mae, Mike Wazowski's girlfriend in the 2001 animated film Monsters Inc.
Celia St James, late wife of Evelyn Hugo, The 7 Husbands of Evelyn Hugo by Taylor Jenkins Reid

English feminine given names
Spanish feminine given names